The Zhengguo Canal, Zhengguoqu or Chengkuo Canal, named after its designer, Zheng Guo, is a large canal located in Shaanxi province, China. The canal irrigates the Guanzhong plain, north of Xi'an. Together with the Dujiangyan Irrigation System and Lingqu Canal, it is one of the three biggest water conservation projects built before the Qin dynasty in ancient China. The canal connects the Jing river and Luo river, northern tributaries of the Wei River.

History
Historian Sima Qian in his Records of the Grand Historian wrote of the Zhengguo Canal:

The plan to drain the resources of the State of Qin back-fired as Qin successfully completed the canal, which irrigated c. 27,000 square kilometres of additional agricultural land, providing the kingdom with sufficient resources to increase the size of its already massive armies. To this day the land surrounding the Zhengguo Canal is extremely fertile.

By the time of its completion in 246 BC, during the Han dynasty, the canal was already much silted. Under the supervision of Bai Gong, a new canal was cut to feed the irrigation in 95 BC. For the next 2000 years, re-cutting and moving the canal's feeder mouth upstream of the Jing River became a pattern as silt built up in the canals and river deepened its bed, diminishing water flow and the efficiency of the system.

See also
 History of canals in China
 Dujiangyan Irrigation System
 Lingqu Canal
 Grand Canal of China

References

Canals in China
Major National Historical and Cultural Sites in Shaanxi
Qin (state)